The Wellcome Centre for Human Genetics is a human genetics research centre of the Nuffield Department of Medicine in the Medical Sciences Division, University of Oxford, funded by the Wellcome Trust among others.

Facilities & resources 
The centre is located at the Henry Wellcome Building of Genomic Medicine, which cost £20 million and was officially opened in June 2000 with Anthony Monaco as the director.

Within the WHG a number of 'cores' provide services to the researchers:

Oxford Genomics Centre 
The Oxford Genomics Centre provides high throughput sequencing services, using Illumina HiSeq4000 2500 and NextSeq500 and MiSeq. They also offer Oxford Nanopore MinION and PromethION sequencing. There are also Array platforms for genotyping, gene expression, and methylation including Illuminia Infinium, Affymetrix and Fluidigm.

Research Computing Core 
The Research Computing Core provides access to computer resources including 4120 cores and 4.2 PB of storage.

Transgenics 
The Transgenics Core provides access to genetically modified mice and cell lines.

Cellular Imaging 
Cellular Imaging Core provides microscopy facilities including fluorescence microscopy (including Fluorescence Correlation Spectroscopy (FCS), Fluorescence Lifetime Correlation Spectroscopy (FLCS), Fluorescence Lifetime Imaging Microscopy (FLIM), Total Internal Reflection Fluorescence Microscopy (TIRF), Photoactivated Localisation Microscopy (PALM), Spectral Imaging (SI) and Single Particle Tracking (SPT).

Research

Statistical and population genetics 
The WHG has been involved in many international statistical genetics advances including the Wellcome Trust Case Control Consortia (WTCCC, WTCCC2), the 1000 Genomes Project and the International HapMap Project.

References

1994 establishments in England
Biotechnology in the United Kingdom
Departments of the University of Oxford
Educational institutions established in 1994
Genetics in the United Kingdom
Genetics or genomics research institutions
Research institutes in Oxford
Wellcome Trust
Medical research institutes in the United Kingdom
Human genetics